The 2006–07 Conference National play-off Final took place on 20 May 2007 and was contested between Morecambe and Exeter City. It was held at Wembley Stadium. The attendance of 40,043 was the largest for a Conference National final at that time, 30,000 of whom were supporting Exeter.

Match

Details

References

Play-off Final
National League (English football) play-off finals
Play-off Final 2007
Play-off Final 2007
Conference Premier play-off Final
National League play-off final
Events at Wembley Stadium